Virginio Levati (born 17 November 1944) is an Italian racing cyclist. He rode in the 1971 Tour de France.

References

External links
 

1944 births
Living people
Italian male cyclists
Place of birth missing (living people)
Cyclists from the Metropolitan City of Milan